M-Doc is a rap artist and producer who was signed to RCA Records and Smash Records in the 1990s. He scored minor chart success with the singles "Free" and "It's a Summer Thang" featuring Chantay Savage. He is currently the president of Indasoul Entertainment.

Career
Williams grew up on the South Side of Chicago, Illinois and graduated from Whitney Young High School in 1987, where he played basketball and was nicknamed "Doc", because he liked NBA basketball star Julius Erving. Williams stated that he started off with a group of friends on the South Side, and used to go to his basement, where his father had enough equipment to get some beats together. They made eight different songs, put them on tape, and sold them at their high schools by hand. The group was called "BP3", because all three members were basketball players.

Local producer Steve "Silk" Hurley heard one of the tapes, and the two collaborated to record "It's Percussion", with Hurley handling the music and Williams billed as "M-Doc" for the first time, rapping. The single came out on London's Jack Trax Records. He then signed with Smash Records and released his first album, Universal Poet, in 1991, which featured two singles "Are U Wid It?" (which sampled Prince's "I Wanna Be Your Lover") and "Whatever U Need".

He then signed with RCA Records and released his second album, M. Doc Wit Stevio: C'mon Getcha Groove On in 1995, which featured "It's a Summer Thang" featuring Chantay Savage, and another single "Like 'Em Like That (Guess I'm Just a Freak)". In 
1996, he produced music in the Midway video game NBA Hangtime.

In 1998, he released his third and final album Young, Black, Rich and Famous, which included "Free"(a Deniece Williams song) featuring Cristina Sanchez.

In the late 1990s, he produced remixes for Madonna, Janet Jackson and Keith Sweat.  Billboard called him "one of the R&B worlds top remixers." Also, CeCe Peniston who sung background vocals on one of his tracks on his third album ("Keep It Real").

Discography

Albums
Universal Poet (1991)
M. Doc Wit Stevio: C'mon Getcha Groove On (1995)
Young, Black, Rich and Famous (1998)

Singles
It's Percussion (1988)
Are U Wid It? (1991)
Whatever U Need (1992)
 It's a Summer Thang (1994)
 Like 'Em Like That (Guess I'm Just A Freak) (1995)
Free (1998)

References

American male rappers
Rappers from Chicago
Year of birth missing (living people)
Living people
21st-century American rappers
21st-century American male musicians